Food Angel is a Hong Kong–based food rescue organization. The organization is supported by local and international food donors, sponsors, and charity partners.

Located in Kowloon and Hong Kong Island, Food Angel has independent offices, kitchens, and a community center. The program rescues approximately 35 tonnes of edible surplus food from the industry, and renders this material into some 10,000 meal boxes and 2,000 food packs which it distributes to the underprivileged.

Objectives 
Food Angel claims to have the goals of reducing food waste at source, alleviating hunger, relieving poverty, and educating the next generation. The idea of Food Angel originated from the pressure on landfills in Hong Kong. When the organization started to grow, it began addressing other food-related social problems, such as poverty. 

Food Angel works with 150 partners, including celebrity partners. It hopes that by large scale promotion, it can raise citizens’ attention to food wastage and the importance of food waste recycling. The goal of the organization is to minimize food waste and to encourage volunteers to give a hand to people in need. Food Angel's vision is to reduce food waste and ensure everyone in Hong Kong is fed three meals a day.

Services 
Food Angel rescues surplus food to relieve the landfill pressure in Hong Kong. The organisation collects surplus food from suppliers, supermarket, wet markets, and donation partners. It receives food donations, including fresh food, canned/non-perishable food, oils and seasoning, cooked foods, and frozen/chilled foods, to prepare meal boxes to then distribute to people in need.

Besides distributing meal boxes at the center, Food Angel also visits the elderly and delivers meal boxes to those who are disabled. It also provides elderly care workshops like literacy classes, Chinese opera, and Erhu performances. It receives support from more than 60 companies and organizations.

Corporate Angel  
Corporate Angel support Food Angel's campaign "Waste Not, Hunger Not". It organizes internal fundraising events to raise money for Food Angel's program.

Green Angel  
Green Angel teaches children to cherish food and preserve the natural resources on Earth. The program offers school-based educational activities over an academic year, including introductory talks, puppet shows, animations, green lessons, food upcycling workshops, field trips, inter-school competitions, and a rewards system.

Outreach Angel  
Outreach Angel delivers free and nutritious hot meals in boxes and non-perishable food packs, and provides loving care to singletons and deprived elderly living in the Eastern District. Outreach Angel provides home delivery service and regular home visits to the single, physically frail, or disabled elderly five days a week.

Community Angel  
Community Angel provides free dine-in food assistance service in the Sham Shui Po District for the vulnerable and frail elderly who are aged 65 or above.

Timeline and news 
Food Angel was founded in 2011 and has started several campaigns since. 

News about Food Angel's activities has been in the media since 2012. For example, there was wide media coverage about the plan to give lunch boxes to the people in need by using food waste, which was introduced in 2015. The three events of Construction Hong Kong appeared in newspapers, such as Apple Daily, Oriental Daily, and Skypost.

References 

 Tung Wah Group of Hospitals
 Food waste
 Hunger
Charities based in Hong Kong